"Money" is the seventh and eighth episode of the fourth season of the American comedy television series The Office, and the show's sixtieth and sixty-first episode overall. It first aired on October 18, 2007, on NBC, and was the last of four consecutive hour-long episodes that opened the fourth season.  The episode was written and directed by Paul Lieberstein, who also acts on the show as Human Resources Representative Toby Flenderson. "Money" marked Lieberstein's directorial debut.

In the episode, Jan, now living with Michael, forces costly changes in Michael's life and he starts to worry about his financial situation. To remedy the problem, Michael leaves work early for a late night job as a telemarketer until 1 a.m. When Ryan finds out, he forces Michael to quit, who then fears that there is no way in which he can support Jan and himself. He hops a train to run away, but Jan meets him and tells him that they can work together to find a way to live. Meanwhile, Dwight pines over Angela, who is later asked out by Andy. After a pep-talk by Jim, Dwight returns as his normal annoying self, to Jim's pleasure. Pam and Jim visit Dwight's family farm, which he has fashioned into a bed and breakfast.

Plot
Michael Scott (Steve Carell) and Jan Levinson (Melora Hardin) discuss her plans to renovate their condo. Not only are the plans costly, but Jan has forced several other changes at Michael's expense, such as trading in both cars to buy her a Porsche Boxster.  Jim Halpert (John Krasinski) and Pam Beesly (Jenna Fischer) discover that Dwight Schrute (Rainn Wilson) is running Schrute Farm as an "agritourism" bed and breakfast. They spend the night there, taking part in table-making demonstrations, beet wine-making, distributing manure and having Dwight read an excerpt from Harry Potter and the Deathly Hallows to them. That night, however, after a series of strange noises, Jim finds Dwight moaning in depression over Angela Martin (Angela Kinsey), while Pam discovers Dwight's Amish cousin Mose (Michael Schur) outside using an outhouse, to which she reacts "What century is this?"
 
Michael begins leaving the office early, refusing to explain himself to his employees and lying to Jan of his whereabouts. In reality, Michael has been combating heavy debt by working as a telemarketer until 1 a.m. At the office the next day, Ryan Howard (B. J. Novak) arrives to find a tired Michael who is unprepared for a presentation due to his moonlighting, and orders Michael to quit his night job or be fired from Dunder Mifflin. At the same time, Kelly Kapoor (Mindy Kaling) flaunts the fact that she is now dating Darryl Philbin (Craig Robinson) in an attempt to make Ryan jealous. They get into a fight 
when Darryl chooses to spend time with his daughter instead of going out with Kelly. After quitting his telemarketing job, Michael desperately attempts to come up with money.

Kelly and Darryl's continuing relationship proves to be dysfunctional, as she cannot comprehend his candor, and he finds her to be attractive yet "crazy." Creed Bratton (Creed Bratton) advises Michael to declare bankruptcy, which Michael does literally by walking into the office and shouting "I declare bankruptcy!", thinking this was all he needed to do. Upon reviewing Michael's financial situation, Oscar Martinez (Oscar Nunez) finds that Michael spends a large amount on useless items like magic kits and bass fishing equipment.

Meanwhile, Jim and Pam feel sorry for Dwight and attempt to cheer him up by posting a positive review of his bed & breakfast on TripAdvisor.com, which pleases him.  However, Andy Bernard (Ed Helms) gains Angela's approval to ask her out on a date by giving her the cat (named Garbage) that Dwight had tried to give Angela earlier, sending Dwight spiraling into crushing depression. Dwight retreats to the stairwell to moan. Jim joins him and recounts his days pining for Pam and how miserable it made him feel, saying he would not wish it on his worst enemy, Dwight included, to experience it, and Dwight realizes that he is not without friends. Having re-opened his old memories, Jim re-enters the office, goes right to Pam and kisses her passionately, and indirectly confesses in an interview that he loves her. Jim and Pam are quietly pleased when Dwight returns to his desk along with his annoying and overbearing personality.

Jan learns of Michael's dismal finances by phone, and immediately harangues Michael about being irresponsible.  He panics and attempts to hop a nearby train.  However, the train is slowing down and comes to a complete halt, upon which he is seen sitting on the train singing to himself. Jan speeds to the office and Oscar tells her in which direction Michael ran. She then runs to the train yard. She tells him that she will stand by him as he did when she was fired. Eventually, they leave the train yard hand in hand.

Production
The episode was both written and directed by Paul Lieberstein, who also plays the part of Toby Flenderson on the show. In the episode, Jim refers to a TripAdvisor page for Dwight's bed and breakfast. This can be found by searching for Schrute Farms. Jim and Pam ("JandP2") post a review, which can be seen on the actual reviews page. It reads: "The architecture reminds one of a quaint Tuscan beet farm, and the natural aroma of the beets drifts into the bedrooms and makes you dream of simpler times. You will never want to leave your room. The informative lecture will satisfy all your beet curiosity, and the dawn goose walk will tug at your heart strings. Table making never seemed so possible. Great story to tell your friends. Plenty of parking! The staff’s attention to detail and devotion to cleanliness was limitless. From their enthusiastic welcome to the last wave good-bye, Schrute Farms delivers."

Reception
The episode was positively reviewed, with many reviewers praising the storylines of its characters and the performances of Krasinski and Wilson, although some reviewers complained about the episode's length. A Buzzsugar.com review stated that "there was something off about this week's episode. It's never really a good thing when I'm checking the clock and feeling antsy at the 20-minute mark of an hour-long episode." An IGN review said "while there's some really funny moments in this episode, overall I really started to feel that hour running time. Of course, as always, that doesn't make this a bad episode, just not one of their best."

The episode's length was not a problem for the staff and readers of IGN, with the former giving it an 8 out of 10 rating, and the latter giving it an average rating of 8.4.  "Money" received a 4.9 Nielsen Rating and a 7% share. The episode was watched by 8.50 million viewers and achieved a 4.4/11 in the adults 18–49 demographic.

For his work as director on the episode Paul Lieberstein received an Emmy nomination for Outstanding Directing for a Comedy. This made it the second fourth-season episode to receive the nomination, with the other being the season finale "Goodbye, Toby".

References

External links
"Money" at NBC.com

The Office (American season 4) episodes
2007 American television episodes
The Office (American TV series) episodes in multiple parts